Chantilly is an unincorporated community in Lincoln County, in the U.S. state of Missouri. The GNIS classifies it as a historically populated place.

History
Chantilly was laid out in 1852, and named after Chantilly, in France.  A post office called Chantilly was established in 1840, and remained in operation until 1918.

References

Unincorporated communities in Lincoln County, Missouri
Unincorporated communities in Missouri